Arbovirus is an informal name for any virus that is transmitted by arthropod vectors. The term arbovirus is a portmanteau word (arthropod-borne virus). Tibovirus (tick-borne virus) is sometimes used to more specifically describe viruses transmitted by ticks, a superorder within the arthropods. Arboviruses can affect both animals (including humans) and plants. In humans, symptoms of arbovirus infection generally occur 3–15 days after exposure to the virus and last three or four days. The most common clinical features of infection are fever, headache, and malaise, but encephalitis and viral hemorrhagic fever may also occur.

Signs and symptoms
The incubation period – the time between when infection occurs and when symptoms appear – varies from virus to virus, but is usually limited between 2 and 15 days for arboviruses. The majority of infections, however, are asymptomatic. Among cases in which symptoms do appear, symptoms tend to be non-specific, resembling a flu-like illness, and are not indicative of a specific causative agent. These symptoms include fever, headache, malaise, rash and fatigue. Rarely, vomiting and hemorrhagic fever may occur. The central nervous system can also be affected by infection, as encephalitis and meningitis are sometimes observed. Prognosis is good for most people, but is poor in those who develop severe symptoms, with up to a 20% mortality rate in this population depending on the virus. The very young, elderly, pregnant women, and people with immune deficiencies are more likely to develop severe symptoms.

Cause

Transmission

Arboviruses maintain themselves in nature by going through a cycle between a host, an organism that carries the virus, and a vector, an organism that carries and transmits the virus to other organisms. For arboviruses, vectors are commonly mosquitoes, ticks, sandflies and other arthropods that consume the blood of vertebrates for nutritious or developmental purposes. Vertebrates which have their blood consumed act as the hosts, with each vector generally having an affinity for the blood of specific species, making those species the hosts.

Transmission between the vector and the host occurs when the vector feeds on the blood of the vertebrate, wherein the virus that has established an infection in the salivary glands of the vector comes into contact with the host's blood. While the virus is inside the host, it undergoes a process called amplification, where the virus replicates at sufficient levels to induce viremia, a condition in which there are large numbers of viruses present in the blood. The abundance of viruses in the host's blood allows the host to transmit the virus to other organisms if its blood is consumed by them. When uninfected vectors become infected from feeding, they are then capable of transmitting the virus to uninfected hosts, resuming amplification of virus populations. If viremia is not achieved in a vertebrate, the species can be called a "dead-end host", as the virus cannot be transmitted back to the vector.

An example of this vector-host relationship can be observed in the transmission of the West Nile virus. Female mosquitoes of the genus Culex prefer to consume the blood of passerine birds, making them the hosts of the virus. When these birds are infected, the virus amplifies, potentially infecting multiple mosquitoes that feed on its blood. These infected mosquitoes may go on to further transmit the virus to more birds. If the mosquito is unable to find its preferred food source, it will choose another. Human blood is sometimes consumed, but since the West Nile virus does not replicate that well in mammals, humans are considered a dead-end host.

In humans
Person-to-person transmission of arboviruses is not common, but can occur. Blood transfusions, organ transplantation, and the use of blood products can transmit arboviruses if the virus is present in the donor's blood or organs. Because of this, blood and organs are often screened for viruses before being administered. Rarely, vertical transmission, or mother-to-child transmission, has been observed in infected pregnant and breastfeeding women. Exposure to used needles may also transmit arboviruses if they have been used by an infected person or animal. This puts intravenous drug users and healthcare workers at risk for infection in regions where the arbovirus may be spreading in human populations.

Virology

Arboviruses are a polyphyletic group, belonging to various viral genera and therefore exhibiting different virologic characteristics.

Diagnosis
Preliminary diagnosis of arbovirus infection is usually based on clinical presentations of symptoms, places and dates of travel, activities, and epidemiological history of the location where infection occurred. Definitive diagnosis is typically made in a laboratory by employing some combination of blood tests, particularly immunologic, serologic and/or virologic techniques such as ELISA, complement fixation, polymerase chain reaction, neutralization test, and hemagglutination-inhibition test.

Classification
In the past, arboviruses were organized into one of four groups: A, B, C, and D. Group A denoted members of the genus Alphavirus, Group B were members of the genus Flavivirus, and Group C remains as the Group C serogroup of the genus Orthobunyavirus. Group D was renamed in the mid-1950s to the Guama group and is currently the Guama serogroup in the genus Orthobunyavirus. Currently, viruses are jointly classified according to Baltimore classification and a virus-specific system based on standard biological classification. With the exception of the African swine fever virus, which belongs to the Asfarviridae family of viruses, all major clinically important arboviruses belong to one of the following four groups:

 Order Bunyavirales (Baltimore class V)
 Genus Banyangvirus
 Huaiyangshan banyangvirus
 Genus Orthobunyavirus
 Bunyamwera virus
 California encephalitis virus
 Jamestown Canyon virus
 La Crosse encephalitis virus
 Genus Orthonairovirus
 Crimean–Congo hemorrhagic fever virus
 Genus Phlebovirus
 Heartland virus
 Rift Valley fever virus
 Toscana virus

 Family Flaviviridae (Baltimore class IV)
 Genus Flavivirus
 Mosquito-borne viruses
 Dengue virus group
 Dengue virus
 Japanese encephalitis virus group
 Japanese encephalitis virus
 Murray Valley encephalitis virus
 St. Louis encephalitis virus
 West Nile virus
 Spondweni virus group
 Spondweni virus
 Zika virus
 Yellow fever virus group
 Yellow fever virus
 Tick-borne viruses
 Mammalian tick-borne virus group
 Kyasanur forest disease virus
 Tick-borne encephalitis virus

 Family Reoviridae (Baltimore class III)
 Subfamily Sedoreovirinae
 Genus Orbivirus
 African horse sickness virus
 Bluetongue disease virus
 Epizootic hemorrhagic disease virus
 Equine encephalosis virus
 Genus Seadornavirus
 Banna virus
 Subfamily Spinareovirinae
 Genus Coltivirus
 Colorado tick fever virus

 Family Togaviridae (Baltimore class IV)
 Genus Alphavirus
 Chikungunya virus'
 Eastern equine encephalitis virus Ross River virus Venezuelan equine encephalitis virus Western equine encephalitis virus'Prevention
Vector control measures, especially mosquito control, are essential to reducing the transmission of disease by arboviruses. Habitat control involves draining swamps and removal of other pools of stagnant water (such as old tires, large outdoor potted plants, empty cans, etc.) that often serve as breeding grounds for mosquitoes. Insecticides can be applied in rural and urban areas, inside houses and other buildings, or in outdoor environments. They are often quite effective for controlling arthropod populations, though use of some of these chemicals is controversial, and some organophosphates and organochlorides (such as DDT) have been banned in many countries. Infertile male mosquitoes have been introduced in some areas in order to reduce the breeding rate of relevant mosquito species. Larvicides are also used worldwide in mosquito abatement programs. Temefos is a common mosquito larvicide.

People can also reduce the risk of getting bitten by arthropods by employing personal protective measures such as sleeping under mosquito nets, wearing protective clothing, applying insect repellents such as permethrin and DEET to clothing and exposed skin, and (where possible) avoiding areas known to harbor high arthropod populations. Arboviral encephalitis can be prevented in two major ways: personal protective measures and public health measures to reduce the population of infected mosquitoes. Personal measures include reducing time outdoors particularly in early evening hours, wearing long pants and long sleeved shirts and applying mosquito repellent to exposed skin areas. Public health measures often require spraying of insecticides to kill juvenile (larvae) and adult mosquitoes.

Vaccination
Vaccines are available for the following arboviral diseases:
 Japanese encephalitis
 Yellow fever
 Tick-borne encephalitis
 Rift Valley Fever (only veterinary use)

Vaccines are in development for the following arboviral diseases:
 Zika Virus
 Dengue fever
 Eastern Equine encephalitis
 West Nile
 Chikungunya
 Rift Valley Fever

Treatment
Because the arboviral encephalitides are viral diseases, antibiotics are not an effective form of treatment and no effective antiviral drugs have yet been discovered. Treatment is supportive, attempting to deal with problems such as swelling of the brain, loss of the automatic breathing activity of the brain and other treatable complications like bacterial pneumonia.Aspirin and ibuprofen should not be taken in cases of dengue fever as it could increase the risk of bleeding and cause Dengue Shock Syndrome.

Epidemiology
Most arboviruses are located in tropical areas, however as a group they have a global distribution. The warm climate conditions found in tropical areas allows for year-round transmission by the arthropod vectors. Other important factors determining geographic distribution of arthropod vectors include rainfall, humidity, and vegetation.

Mapping methods such as GIS and GPS have allowed for spatial and temporal analyses of arboviruses. Tagging cases or breeding sites geographically has allowed for deeper examination of vector transmission.

To see the epidemiology of specific arboviruses, the following resources hold maps, fact sheets, and reports on arboviruses and arboviral epidemics.

History

Arboviruses were not known to exist until the rise of modern medicine, with the germ theory and an understanding that viruses were distinct from other microorganisms. The connection between arthropods and disease was not postulated until 1881 when Cuban doctor and scientist Carlos Finlay proposed that yellow fever may be transmitted by mosquitoes instead of human contact, a reality that was verified by Major Walter Reed in 1901. The primary vector, Aedes aegypti, had spread globally from the 15th to the 19th centuries as a result of globalization and the slave trade. This geographic spreading caused dengue fever epidemics throughout the 18th and 19th centuries, and later, in 1906, transmission by the Aedes mosquitoes was confirmed, making yellow fever and dengue fever the first two diseases known to be caused by viruses.

Thomas Milton Rivers published the first clear description of a virus as distinct from a bacterium in 1927. The discovery of the West Nile virus came in 1937, and has since been found in Culex'' populations causing epidemics throughout Africa, the Middle East, and Europe. The virus was introduced into the Western Hemisphere in 1999, sparking a series of epidemics. During the latter half of the 20th century, Dengue fever reemerged as a global disease, with the virus spreading geographically due to urbanization, population growth, increased international travel, and global warming, and continues to cause at least 50 million infections per year, making Dengue fever the most common and clinically important arboviral disease.

Yellow fever, alongside malaria, was a major obstacle in the construction of the Panama Canal. French supervision of the project in the 1880s was unsuccessful because of these diseases, forcing the abandonment of the project in 1889. During the American effort to construct the canal in the early 1900s, William C. Gorgas, the Chief Sanitary Officer of Havana, was tasked with overseeing the health of the workers. He had past success in eradicating the disease in Florida and Havana by reducing mosquito populations through draining nearby pools of water, cutting grass, applying oil to the edges of ponds and swamps to kill larvae, and capturing adult mosquitoes that remained indoors during the daytime. Joseph Augustin LePrince, the Chief Sanitary Inspector of the Canal Zone, invented the first commercial larvicide, a mixture of carbolic acid, resin, and caustic soda, to be used throughout the Canal Zone. The combined implementation of these sanitation measures led to a dramatic decline in the number of workers dying and the eventual eradication of yellow fever in the Canal Zone as well as the containment of malaria during the 10-year construction period. Because of the success of these methods at preventing disease, they were adopted and improved upon in other regions of the world.

See also 
 List of diseases spread by invertebrates
 List of insect-borne diseases
 Mosquito-borne disease
 Robovirus
 Tibovirus
 Tick-borne disease

References

External links 
 

Viruses
Tropical diseases